The 2010–11 New York Rangers season was the franchise's 84th season of play and their 85th season overall. The Rangers celebrated 85 years since their establishment in 1926.

Pre-season
After an off-season of speculation and rumors, the Rangers waived veteran defenseman Wade Redden on September 25. By waiving Redden, the Rangers were able to rid themselves of his large salary and have more flexibility to sign players under the current salary cap.

Regular season
The Rangers won their first game of the season, on October 9 at Buffalo. Derek Stepan had a hat trick in the 6–3 win, becoming only the fourth player in NHL history to record a hat trick in his first career NHL game.

On November 12, 2010, the Rangers unveiled their 85th anniversary Heritage "third" jersey at an event at Rockefeller Center. The Rangers wore the jersey for a game for the first time on November 17 against the Boston Bruins.

Three Rangers participated in the 2011 NHL All-Star Game. Marc Staal and Henrik Lundqvist played in the main game, and rookie Derek Stepan took part in the SuperSkills Competition.

On April 4, 2011, the Rangers beat the Boston Bruins 5–3 after trailing in the game 3–0. According to the Versus broadcasters, this was the first time in franchise history that the Rangers were able to overcome a 3–0 deficit to the Bruins to win the game. The two teams had played each other 624 times since 1926.

The Rangers tied the Boston Bruins for the most shutouts for, with 11.

Standings

Divisional standings

Conference standings

Schedule and results

Pre-season

Regular season

|- align="center" bgcolor="#ccffcc"
| 1 || 9 || @ Buffalo Sabres || 6 - 3 || Lundqvist || 1-0-0
|- align="center" bgcolor="#ffbbbb"
| 2 || 11 || @ New York Islanders || 6 - 4 || Lundqvist || 1-1-0
|- align="center" bgcolor="white"
| 3 || 15 || Toronto Maple Leafs || 4 - 3 OT || Lundqvist || 1-1-1
|- align="center" bgcolor="#ffbbbb"
| 4 || 18 || Colorado Avalanche || 3 - 1 || Lundqvist || 1-2-1
|- align="center" bgcolor="#ccffcc"
| 5 || 21 || @ Toronto Maple Leafs || 2 - 1 || Biron || 2-2-1
|- align="center" bgcolor="#ccffcc"
| 6 || 23 || @ Boston Bruins || 3 - 2 || Lundqvist || 3-2-1
|- align="center" bgcolor="#ccffcc"
| 7 || 24 || New Jersey Devils || 3 - 1 || Lundqvist || 4-2-1
|- align="center" bgcolor="#ffbbbb"
| 8 || 27 || Atlanta Thrashers || 6 - 4 || Biron || 4-3-1
|- align="center" bgcolor="#ffbbbb"
| 9 || 29 || Carolina Hurricanes || 4 - 3 || Lundqvist || 4-4-1
|- align="center" bgcolor="#ccffcc"
| 10 || 30 || @ Toronto Maple Leafs || 2 - 0 || Lundqvist || 5-4-1
|-

|- align="center" bgcolor="ccffcc"
| 11 || 1 || Chicago Blackhawks || 4 - 2 || Lundqvist || 6-4-1
|- align="center" bgcolor="#ffbbbb"
| 12 || 4 || @ Philadelphia Flyers || 4 - 1 || Lundqvist || 6-5-1
|- align="center" bgcolor="#ccffcc"
| 13 || 5 || @ New Jersey Devils || 3 - 0 || Lundqvist || 7-5-1
|- align="center" bgcolor="#ffbbbb"
| 14 || 7 || St. Louis Blues || 2 - 0 || Biron || 7-6-1
|- align="center" bgcolor="#ffbbbb"
| 15 || 9 || Washington Capitals || 5 - 3 || Lundqvist || 7-7-1
|- align="center" bgcolor="#ccffcc"
| 16 || 11 || Buffalo Sabres || 3 - 2 OT || Biron || 8-7-1
|- align="center" bgcolor="#ccffcc"
| 17 || 14 || Edmonton Oilers || 8 - 2 || Biron || 9-7-1
|- align="center" bgcolor="#ccffcc"
| 18 || 15 || @ Pittsburgh Penguins || 3 - 2 OT || Lundqvist || 10-7-1
|- align="center" bgcolor="#ffbbbb"
| 19 || 17 || Boston Bruins || 3 - 2 || Lundqvist || 10-8-1
|- align="center" bgcolor="#ffbbbb"
| 20 || 19 || @ Colorado Avalanche || 5 - 1 || Lundqvist || 10-9-1
|- align="center" bgcolor="#ccffcc"
| 21 || 20 || @ Minnesota Wild || 5 - 2 || Biron || 11-9-1
|- align="center" bgcolor="#ccffcc"
| 22 || 22 || Calgary Flames || 2 - 1 || Biron || 12-9-1
|- align="center" bgcolor="#ffbbbb"
| 23 || 24 || @ Tampa Bay Lightning || 5 - 3 || Lundqvist || 12-10-1
|- align="center" bgcolor="ccffcc"
| 24 || 26 || @ Florida Panthers || 3 - 0 || Lundqvist || 13-10-1
|- align="center" bgcolor="ccffcc"
| 25 || 27 || @ Nashville Predators || 2 - 1 SO || Lundqvist || 14-10-1
|- align="center" bgcolor="#ffbbbb"
| 26 || 29 || Pittsburgh Penguins || 3 - 1 || Lundqvist || 14-11-1
|-

|- align="center" bgcolor="ccffcc"
| 27 || 2 || @ New York Islanders || 6 - 5 || Lundqvist || 15-11-1
|- align="center" bgcolor="ccffcc"
| 28 || 3 || New York Islanders || 2 - 0 || Lundqvist || 16-11-1
|- align="center" bgcolor="#ffbbbb"
| 29 || 5 || Ottawa Senators || 3 - 1 || Lundqvist || 16-12-1
|- align="center" bgcolor="ccffcc"
| 30 || 9 || @ Ottawa Senators || 5 - 3 || Lundqvist || 17-12-1
|- align="center" bgcolor="#ffbbbb"
| 31 || 11 || @ Columbus Blue Jackets || 3 - 1 || Lundqvist || 17-13-1
|- align="center" bgcolor="ccffcc"
| 32 || 12 || Washington Capitals || 7 - 0 || Lundqvist || 18-13-1
|- align="center" bgcolor="ccffcc"
| 33 || 15 || @ Pittsburgh Penguins || 4 - 1 || Lundqvist || 19-13-1
|- align="center" bgcolor="ccffcc"
| 34 || 16 || Phoenix Coyotes || 4 - 3 SO || Biron || 20-13-1
|- align="center" bgcolor="#ffbbbb"
| 35 || 18 || @ Philadelphia Flyers || 4 - 1 || Lundqvist || 20-14-1
|- align="center" bgcolor="white"
| 36 || 23 || Tampa Bay Lightning || 4 - 3 SO || Lundqvist || 20-14-2
|- align="center" bgcolor="ccffcc"
| 37 || 27 || New York Islanders || 7 - 2 || Lundqvist || 21-14-2
|- align="center" bgcolor="ccffcc"
| 38 || 29 || @ New Jersey Devils || 3 - 1 || Lundqvist || 22-14-2
|-

|- align="center" bgcolor="white"
| 39 || 1 || @ Tampa Bay Lightning || 2 - 1 OT || Lundqvist || 22-14-3
|- align="center" bgcolor="#ffbbbb"
| 40 || 2 || @ Florida Panthers || 3 - 0 || Lundqvist || 22-15-3
|- align="center" bgcolor="ccffcc"
| 41 || 5 || Carolina Hurricanes || 2 - 1 OT || Lundqvist || 23-15-3
|- align="center" bgcolor="ccffcc"
| 42 || 7 || @ Dallas Stars || 3 - 2 SO || Lundqvist || 24-15-3
|- align="center" bgcolor="ccffcc"
| 43 || 8 || @ St. Louis Blues || 2 - 1 || Biron || 25-15-3
|- align="center" bgcolor="#ffbbbb"
| 44 || 11 || Montreal Canadiens || 2 - 1 || Lundqvist || 25-16-3
|- align="center" bgcolor="ccffcc"
| 45 || 13 || Vancouver Canucks || 1 - 0 || Lundqvist || 26-16-3
|- align="center" bgcolor="#ffbbbb"
| 46 || 15 || @ Montreal Canadiens || 3 - 2 || Lundqvist || 26-17-3
|- align="center" bgcolor="#ffbbbb"
| 47 || 16 || Philadelphia Flyers || 3 - 2 || Biron || 26-18-3
|- align="center" bgcolor="ccffcc"
| 48 || 19 || Toronto Maple Leafs || 7 - 0 || Lundqvist || 27-18-3
|- align="center" bgcolor="#ffbbbb"
| 49 || 20 || @ Carolina Hurricanes || 4 - 1 || Lundqvist || 27-19-3
|- align="center" bgcolor="ccffcc"
| 50 || 22 || @ Atlanta Thrashers || 3 - 2 SO || Lundqvist || 28-19-3
|- align="center" bgcolor="ccffcc"
| 51 || 24 || @ Washington Capitals || 2 - 1 SO || Biron || 29-19-3
|- align="center" bgcolor="#ffbbbb"
| 52 || 25 || Florida Panthers || 4 - 3 || Lundqvist || 29-20-3
|-

|- align="center" bgcolor="white"
| 53 || 1 || Pittsburgh Penguins || 4 - 3 SO || Lundqvist || 29-20-4
|- align="center" bgcolor="#ffbbbb"
| 54 || 3 || New Jersey Devils || 3 - 2 || Lundqvist || 29-21-4
|- align="center" bgcolor="#ffbbbb"
| 55 || 5 || @ Montreal Canadiens || 2 - 0 || Biron || 29-22-4
|- align="center" bgcolor="#ffbbbb"
| 56 || 7 || @ Detroit Red Wings || 3 - 2 || Biron || 29-23-4
|- align="center" bgcolor="#ffbbbb"
| 57 || 11 || @ Atlanta Thrashers || 3 - 2 || Lundqvist || 29-24-4
|- align="center" bgcolor="ccffcc"
| 58 || 13 || Pittsburgh Penguins || 5 - 3 || Lundqvist || 30-24-4
|- align="center" bgcolor="ccffcc"
| 59 || 17 || Los Angeles Kings || 4 - 3 SO || Lundqvist || 31-24-4
|- align="center" bgcolor="ffbbbb"
| 60 || 18 || @ New Jersey Devils || 1 - 0 || Lundqvist || 31-25-4
|- align="center" bgcolor="ffbbbb"
| 61 || 20 || Philadelphia Flyers || 4 - 2 || Lundqvist || 31-26-4
|- align="center" bgcolor="ccffcc"
| 62 || 22 || @ Carolina Hurricanes || 4 - 3 SO || Lundqvist || 32-26-4
|- align="center" bgcolor="ccffcc"
| 63 || 25 || @ Washington Capitals || 6 - 0 || Lundqvist || 33-26-4
|- align="center" bgcolor="ffbbbb"
| 64 || 27 || Tampa Bay Lightning || 2 - 1 || Lundqvist || 33-27-4
|-

|- align="center" bgcolor="ffbbbb"
| 65 || 1 || Buffalo Sabres || 3 - 2 || Lundqvist || 33-28-4
|- align="center" bgcolor="ffbbbb"
| 66 || 3 || Minnesota Wild || 3 - 1 || Lundqvist || 33-29-4
|- align="center" bgcolor="ccffcc"
| 67 || 4 || @ Ottawa Senators || 4 - 1 || Lundqvist || 34-29-4
|- align="center" bgcolor="ccffcc"
| 68 || 6 || Philadelphia Flyers || 7 - 0 || Lundqvist || 35-29-4
|- align="center" bgcolor="ffbbbb"
| 69 || 9 || @ Anaheim Ducks || 5 - 2 || Lundqvist || 35-30-4
|- align="center" bgcolor="ccffcc"
| 70 || 12 || @ San Jose Sharks || 3 - 2 SO || Lundqvist || 36-30-4
|- align="center" bgcolor="ccffcc"
| 71 || 15 || New York Islanders || 6 - 3 || Lundqvist || 37-30-4
|- align="center" bgcolor="ccffcc"
| 72 || 18 || Montreal Canadiens || 6 - 3 || Lundqvist || 38-30-4
|- align="center" bgcolor="ccffcc"
| 73 || 20 || @ Pittsburgh Penguins || 5 - 2 || Lundqvist || 39-30-4
|- align="center" bgcolor="ccffcc"
| 74 || 22 || Florida Panthers || 1 - 0 || Lundqvist || 40-30-4
|- align="center" bgcolor="white"
| 75 || 24 || Ottawa Senators || 2 - 1 SO || Lundqvist || 40-30-5
|- align="center" bgcolor="ccffcc"
| 76 || 26 || @ Boston Bruins || 1 - 0 || Lundqvist || 41-30-5
|- align="center" bgcolor="ffbbbb"
| 77 || 30 || @ Buffalo Sabres || 1 - 0 || Lundqvist || 41-31-5
|- align="center" bgcolor="ffbbbb"
| 78 || 31 || @ New York Islanders || 6 - 2 || Lundqvist || 41-32-5
|-

|- align="center" bgcolor="ccffcc"
| 79 || 3 || @ Philadelphia Flyers || 3 - 2 SO || Lundqvist || 42-32-5
|- align="center" bgcolor="ccffcc"
| 80 || 4 || Boston Bruins || 5 - 3 || Lundqvist || 43-32-5
|- align="center" bgcolor="ffbbbb"
| 81 || 7 || Atlanta Thrashers || 3 - 0 || Lundqvist || 43-33-5
|- align="center" bgcolor="ccffcc"
| 82 || 9 || New Jersey Devils || 5 - 2 || Lundqvist || 44-33-5
|-

Playoffs

For the second straight season, the Rangers playoff hopes came down to the final game of the regular season. The Rangers defeated the Devils 5-2 on the afternoon of April 9, 2011 and then had to wait for the result of the Carolina Hurricanes vs. Tampa Bay Lightning game that night. The Lightning defeated the Hurricanes, securing the Rangers spot in the playoffs. (Both the New York Islanders and the New Jersey Devils missed the 2011 playoffs; had the Rangers also failed to qualify, it would have marked the first time since 1966 that the Stanley Cup Playoffs did not feature a club from the New York metro area.) The Rangers qualified for the playoffs, after missing the playoffs last season for the first time since the lockout, as the #8 seed. They were defeated by the #1 seeded Washington Capitals in the first round.

Key:  Win  Loss

Player statistics
Skaters

Goaltenders

†Denotes player spent time with another team before joining Rangers. Stats reflect time with Rangers only.
‡Traded mid-season. Stats reflect time with Rangers only.

Awards and records

Awards

Records
With a 6–3 win over the Montreal Canadiens on March 18, 2011, Henrik Lundqvist became the first goalie in NHL history to record 30 wins or more in each of his first six seasons.

Milestones

Transactions
The Rangers have been involved in the following transactions during the 2010–11 season.

Trades

Free agents acquired

Free agents lost

Claimed via waivers

Lost via waivers

Lost via retirement

Player signings

Draft picks
New York's picks at the 2010 NHL Entry Draft in Los Angeles, California.

See also
 2010–11 NHL season

Farm teams

Hartford Wolf Pack / Connecticut Whale (AHL)
The 2010–11 season will be the 14th season of AHL hockey for the franchise. The Hartford Wolf Pack became the Connecticut Whale on November 27, 2010.

Greenville Road Warriors (ECHL)
The 2010–11 season will be the 1st season of affiliation for the Rangers and the Road Warriors.

References
 Game log: New York Rangers game log on espn.com
 Player stats: New York Rangers statistics on espn.com

External links
 2010–11 New York Rangers season at ESPN
 2010–11 New York Rangers season at Hockey Reference

New York Rangers seasons
New York Rangers
New York Rangers
New York Rangers
New York Rangers
 in Manhattan
Madison Square Garden